The National Action Charter of Bahrain is a document put forward by King Hamad ibn Isa Al Khalifah of Bahrain in 2001 in order to end the popular 1990s Uprising and return the country to constitutional rule. It was approved in a national referendum in 2001, in which 98.4% of the voters voted in favor of the document.

Referendum
The referendum took place on 14 and 15 February. Voter turnout was 90.2%, with 98.41% voting in favour. With a total population of 620,500, around 35.1% had voted in the referendum.

Results

See also
Full text of the National Action Charter of Bahrain

References

Politics of Bahrain
Referendums in Bahrain
Elections in Bahrain
2001 referendums
Law of Bahrain
Bahrain
2001 in Bahrain
2001 documents